David Wilson (born 6 September 1994) is a Scottish professional footballer who plays as a midfielder for Dumbarton.

Career
Wilson joined Partick Thistle in the summer of 2011, and made his senior debut for the club on 1 January 2014. He signed a new one-year contract in June 2014. He signed on loan for Stranraer in January 2017. Wilson left Firhill in May 2017, after his contract with the club was not renewed. After leaving Thistle, Wilson signed a one-year deal with Scottish Championship club Dumbarton on 26 June 2017. He scored his first senior goal for the Sons, in a 2–1 Scottish Challenge Cup victory over Connah's Quay Nomads. Wilson was released by Dumbarton at the end of the 2017–18 season and joined Scottish League Two side Annan Athletic.

After playing with Stirling Albion, he signed for Albion Rovers in 2021. He returned for a second spell at Dumbarton in May 2022.

Career statistics

References

External links

1994 births
Living people
Scottish footballers
Partick Thistle F.C. players
Stranraer F.C. players
Dumbarton F.C. players
Scottish Professional Football League players
Association football midfielders
Annan Athletic F.C. players
Stirling Albion F.C. players
Albion Rovers F.C. players